The 1912 United States presidential election in Rhode Island took place on November 5, 1912, as part of the 1912 United States presidential election which was held throughout all contemporary 48 states. Voters chose five representatives, or electors to the Electoral College, who voted for president and vice president. 

Rhode Island was won by the Democratic Party nominees, New Jersey Governor Woodrow Wilson and Indiana Governor Thomas R. Marshall. Wilson and Marshall defeated incumbent President William Howard Taft, and his running mate Vice President James S. Sherman and Progressive Party candidates, former President Theodore Roosevelt and his running mate California Governor Hiram Johnson. 

Wilson won Rhode Island by a narrow margin of 3.48%, becoming the first Democratic presidential candidate since Franklin Pierce in 1852 to win the state. Another Democratic candidate wouldn't win Rhode Island again until Al Smith won it in 1928.

Results

Results by town

See also
 United States presidential elections in Rhode Island

Notes

References

Rhode Island
1912
1912 Rhode Island elections